Frans Aerenhouts (4 July 1937 – 30 January 2022) was a Belgian cyclist. He died on 30 January 2022, at the age of 84. He most notably won Gent–Wevelgem in 1960 and 1961 and a stage of the 1963 Vuelta a España.

Major results

1957
 1st Overall Tour de Berlin
1958
 1st Stage 3 Tour de l'Ouest
 3rd Road race, National Road Championships
 9th Road race, UCI Road World Championships
1959
 1st Omloop Mandel-Leie-Schelde
 3rd Four Days of Dunkirk
 6th Bordeaux–Paris
 8th Liège–Bastogne–Liège
 8th Paris–Tours
 9th Paris–Roubaix
1960
 1st Gent–Wevelgem
 2nd Ronde van Limburg
 6th Paris–Roubaix
1961
 1st Gent–Wevelgem
 2nd E3 Harelbeke
 3rd La Flèche Wallonne
1962
7th Paris–Roubaix
10th Bordeaux–Paris
1963
 1st Stage 12 Vuelta a España
 2nd Schaal Sels
 3rd Road race, National Road Championships
1964
 3rd Scheldeprijs
 4th Omloop Het Volk
1965
 1st Grote Prijs Stad Zottegem
 2nd Grand Prix d'Isbergues
1966
 2nd Schaal Sels
1967
 1st Grand Prix d'Antibes

References

External links

1937 births
2022 deaths
Cyclists from Antwerp
Belgian male cyclists
Belgian Vuelta a España stage winners
People from Wilrijk
20th-century Belgian people